Hypercompe marcescens is a moth of the family Erebidae first described by Felder and Rogenhofer in 1874. It is found in Brazil (Amazonas) and Ecuador.

References

Hypercompe
Moths described in 1874